The 2018 FIVB Volleyball Men's Challenger Cup qualification was a series of tournaments to decide teams which played in the 2018 FIVB Volleyball Men's Challenger Cup. The 2018 Challenger Cup featured 6 teams. Only one place was allocated to the hosts. The remaining 5 places were determined by a qualification process, in which entrants from among the other teams from the five FIVB confederations competed.

Qualification summary
1.Originally, the CAVB would have a direct spot in the Challenger Cup, while the representatives from AVC and CSV would play a playoff for a spot. However, FIVB fined the CAVB for not hosting any kind of qualifier event and the winners of the AVC and CSV qualifier booked a direct qualification.

Means of qualification

Continental qualification tournaments

AVC (Asia and Oceania)

Venue:  Baluan Sholak Sports Palace, Almaty, Kazakhstan
Dates: 18–20 May 2018
The winners qualified for the 2018 Challenger Cup.

CAVB (Africa)
CAVB was deprived of the right to participate in the 2018 Challenger Cup because it did not hosting any kind of qualifier event. So the AVC–CSV playoff was canceled and the winners of the AVC and CSV qualifier directly qualified for the 2018 Challenger Cup.

CEV (Europe)

Final venue:  KV Arena, Karlovy Vary, Czech Republic
Dates: 19 May – 14 June 2018
The top two teams which had not yet qualified to the 2018 Challenger Cup qualified for the 2018 Challenger Cup.

CSV (South America)

Venue:  Centro Nacional de Entrenamiento Olímpico, Santiago, Chile
Dates: 18–20 May 2018
The winners qualified for the 2018 Challenger Cup.

NORCECA (North America)

Venue:  Sala 19 de noviembre, Pinar del Río, Cuba
Dates: 5–9 June 2018
The winners qualified for the 2018 Challenger Cup.

References

External links
Qualification Process
2018 Challenger Cup Asian Qualifier – official website
2018 Challenger Cup North American Qualifier – official website
2018 Challenger Cup South American Qualifier – official website

 
FIVB Volleyball Men's Challenger Cup qualification